Triple Divide Peak is a mountain along the Great Western Divide in the Sierra Nevada range on the boundary between Kings Canyon and Sequoia national parks, in Tulare County, California.

Near Kaweah Gap, the peak divides three important watersheds: the Kern River, the Kaweah River, and the Kings River. This three-way divide leads to the peak's name. At one time, it was also called The Keystone.

The Kaweah Peaks Ridge spurs off to the south, while the Kings-Kaweah Divide branches off to the west.

References

External links 
 

Mountains of Kings Canyon National Park
Mountains of Sequoia National Park
Mountains of Tulare County, California
North American 3000 m summits